Waldburg-Zeil was a County and later Principality within Holy Roman Empire, ruled by the House of Waldburg, located in southeastern Baden-Württemberg, Germany, located around Schloss Zeil, near Leutkirch im Allgäu.

History 
Waldburg-Zeil was a partition of Waldburg-Wolfegg-Zeil. Originally ruled by Truchesses (stewards), Waldburg-Zeil was elevated to a County in 1628, and a Principality in 1803 shortly before being mediatised to Württemberg in 1806.

In 1674, Waldburg-Zeil was partitioned between itself and Waldburg-Wurzach. Count Francis Anthony inherited Waldburg-Trauchburg in 1772 (the districts of Friedburg and Scheer were later sold to Thurn und Taxis in 1785), and Steward Froben and Steward Henry of Waldburg-Wolfegg partitioned Waldburg-Waldburg after the death of Steward Gebhard.

Rulers of Waldburg-Zeil

Stewards of Waldburg-Zeil (1589–1628) 
 Froben (1589–1614)
 John James I (1614–28)

Counts of Waldburg-Zeil (1628–1803) 
 John James I (1628–74)
 Paris James (1674–84)
 John Christopher (1684–1717)
 John James II (1717–50)
 Francis Anthony (1750–90)
 Maximilian Wunibald (1790–1803)

Princes of Waldburg-Zeil(-Trauchburg) (1803–1806) 
 Maximilian Wunibald (1803–06)

The present prince is Erich, Fürst von Waldburg zu Zeil und Trauchburg (born 1962), the only son of Georg, Prince von Waldburg zu Zeil und Trauchburg (1928-2015) and Princess Marie Gabrielle of Bavaria (b. 1931), daughter of Albrecht, Duke of Bavaria. In 1988 he married Mathilde, Duchess of Württemberg, daughter of Carl, Duke of Württemberg and Princess Diane of Orléans. As Erich has five daughters, his heir presumptive is his first cousin, Count Clemens von Waldburg-Zeil (b. 1960), married to Princess Georgina of Liechtenstein, who has three sons.

  Maximilian Wunibald, 1st Prince 1803-1818 (1750-1818)
  Franz-Thäddaus, 2nd Prince 1818-1845 (1778-1845)
  Constantin Maximilian, 3rd Prince 1845-1862 (1807-1862)
  Wilhelm, 4th Prince 1862-1906 (1835-1906)
  Georg, 5th Prince 1906-1918 (1867-1918)
  Erich August, 6th Prince 1918-1953 (1899-1953)
 Georg, 7th Prince 1953-2015 (1928-2015) - married to princess Marie Gabrielle of Bavaria, daughter of Albrecht, Duke of Bavaria. 
  Erich, 8th Prince 2015–present (b.1962) - married to duchess Mathilde of Württemberg, daughter of Carl, Duke of Württemberg
  Count Aloysius (1933-2014)
  Count Clemens (b.1960)
 Count Eduard (b.1985)
 Count Maximilian (b.1992)
  Count Constantin (b.1994)

Lustenau-Hohenems branch 

In 1779 a side branch of the Counts of Waldburg-Zeil inherited the sovereign county of Lustenau by marriage. The county was mediatized to Bavaria in 1806 and became part of Austria in 1830. The present Count is Franz Josef von Waldburg-Zeil-Hohenems.

References

1589 establishments in the Holy Roman Empire